, the International Hydrographic Organization (IHO) comprised 98 Member States, two of which are suspended because of their lapsed annual financial contribution. The IHO identifies its representative member organisations as the respective national hydrographic office(s). These organisations may themselves be part of wider national maritime or other administrations covering a larger range of tasks – such as the national organisations for transport, maritime regulation, environment, defence or oceanography. For example, in Norway and New Zealand the hydrographic offices are sub-organisations of the country's national geodata organisation; in the UK and France, they are part of the Ministry of Defence; in Finland the hydrographic Office is part of the department of transport. The up to date list of IHO Member States, their representative organisations and contact details are maintained in the IHO Yearbook - available at www.iho.int

List 

  – Albanian Hydrographic Service
  – Hydrographic Office of the Algerian National Navy
  – Instituto Hidrografico e de Signalização Maritíma de Angola (IHSMA)
  – Argentine Naval Hydrographic Service
  – Australian Hydrographic Service
  – Bahraini Hydrographic Survey Directorate
  – Bangladeshi Directorate of Hydrography
  – Flemish Hydrography
  – Brazilian Directorate of Hydrography and Navigation
  – Brunei Directorate of Hydrography and Navigation
  – Hydrographical Service at Ministry of Defense
  – Autonomous Port of Douala
 - Canadian Hydrographic Service
  – Hydrographic and Oceanographic Service of the Chilean Navy
  – Chinese Maritime Safety Administration
  – Colombian National Ministry of Defence, Colombian Navy, General Maritime Directorate
  – Hydrographic Institute of the Republic of Croatia
  – Cuban National Office of Hydrography and Geodesy
  – Cypriotic National Hydrographic Committee, The Department of Lands and Surveys
  Democratic People's Republic of Korea – DPRK Hydrographic Department
  – Ministry of Transport and Communications, Ports and Studies Division
  – Danish Geodata Agency
  – Hydrographic Service of the Navy of the Dominican Republic
  – Oceanographic Institute of the Ecuadorian Navy
  – Egyptian Navy Hydrographic Department
  – Estonian Maritime Administration (Aids to Navigation and Hydrography Division)
  – Republic of Fiji Navy Hydrographic Office
  – Finnish Transport Agency Hydrographic Office
  – Naval Hydrographic and Oceanographic Service
  – State Hydrographic Service of Georgia
  – Federal Maritime and Hydrographic Agency of Germany
  – Maritime Authority, Ministry of Transport
  – Hellenic Navy Hydrographic Service
  – Guatemalan Ministry of Defence, General Directorate of Maritime Affairs
  – Maritime Administration Department
  – Icelandic Coast Guard Hydrographic Department
  – Indian Naval Hydrographic Department
  – Indonesian Hydro-Oceanographic Service
  – Iranian Ports and Maritime Organisation
  – Ministry of Transport and Communications - General Company for Iraqi Ports, Basrah
  – Irish Marine Survey Administration
  – Italian Hydrographic Institute
  – Jamaican Surveys and Mapping Division
  – Japanese Hydrographic and Oceanographic Department
  – Survey of Kenya
  – Kuwait Ministry of Communications
  – Maritime Administration of Latvia, Hydrographic Service
  – Lebanese Navy Hydrogaphic Service
  – Malaysian National Hydrographic Centre
  – Transport Malta, Ministry for Transport and Infrastructure
  -Mauritian Ministry of Housing and Lands
  – General Directorate of Oceanography, Hydrography and Meteorology of the Mexican Navy
  – Monaco Directorate of Naval Affairs
  – Institute of Hydrometeorology and Seismology of Montenegro
  – Hydrography, Oceanography and Cartography Division of the Royal Moroccan Navy
  – Mozambican National Institute of Hydrography and Navigation
  – Myanmar Naval Hydrographic Centre
  – Dutch Hydrographic Service
  – Land Information New Zealand
  – Nigerian Navy Hydrographic Office
  – Norwegian Hydrographic Office
  – National Hydrographic Office of the Royal Navy of Oman
  – Hydrographic Department of the Pakistani Navy
  – National Maritime Safety Authority of Papua New Guinea
  – Peruvian Directorate of Hydrography and Navigation
  – Philippine National Mapping and Resource Information Authority
  – Hydrographic Office of the Polish Navy
  – Portuguese Hydrographic Institute
  – Qatari Ministry of Municipality and Urban Planning
  – Romanian Maritime Hydrographic Directorate
  – Russian Hydrographic Service
  – Ministry of Works, Transport and Infrastructure
  – Saudi Arabian General Commission for Survey
  – Seychelles Maritime Safety Authority 
  – Hydrographic Department, Maritime and Port Authority of Singapore
  – Slovenian Ministry of Infrastructure
  – Solomon Islands Maritime Safety Administration
  – South African Hydrographic Office
  – Korea Hydrographic and Oceanographic Agency
  – Hydrographic Institute of the Royal Spanish Navy
  – Sri Lankan National Hydrographic Office, National Aquatic Resources Research and Development Agency 
  – Maritime Authority Suriname
   - Swedish Maritime Administration
  – Hydrographic Department of the Royal Thai Navy
  – Tongan Ministry of Infrastructure
  – Hydrographic Unit, Ministry of Agriculture & Marine Resources, Lands and Surveys Division
  – Hydrographic and Oceanographic Centre of the Tunisian Navy
  – Turkish Office of Navigation, Hydrography and Oceanography
  – State Hydrographic Service of Ukraine
  – Ministry of Communications, National Port Authority of the United Arab Emirates
  – United Kingdom Hydrographic Office
  – Office of Coast Survey; National Ocean Service
  – Oceanographic, Hydrographic and Meteorological Service of the Uruguayan Navy
  – Ministry of Lands, Geology, and Minerals
  – General Command of the Venezuelan Navy, Directorate of Hydrography and Navigation
  – Naval Command of Vietnam

Suspended 
  – Serbian Directorate for Inland Waterways – suspended since January 2013
  – Syrian General Directorate of Ports - suspended since 1 June 2018

Footnotes

External links 

 International Hydrographic Organization
 Australian Hydrographic Office
 Hong Kong Hydrographic Office
 Indian Naval Hydrographic Department
 Hydrographic and Oceanographic Department (Japan)
 Bundesamt für Seeschiffahrt und Hydrographie (Germany)
 United Kingdom Hydrographic Office
 National Oceanic and Atmospheric Administration (United States)
 Servicio Hidrográfico y Oceanográfico de la Armada (Chile)
 Sjöfartsverket (Sweden)
 Service Hydrographique et Océanographique de la Marine (France)
 Canadian Hydrographic Service
 Primar ENC Service s
 Hydrography division of Kort & Matrikelstyrelsen (Denmark)
 Hellenic Navy Hydrographic Service

Hydrography organizations
Hydro
Hydro
Navigation organizations